Derek Alan Trevithick Tangye (29 February 1912 – 26 October 1996) was a British author who lived in Cornwall for nearly fifty years. He wrote nineteen books which became known as The Minack Chronicles, about his simple life on a clifftop daffodil farm called Dorminack, affectionately referred to as Minack, at St Buryan in the far west of Cornwall with his wife Jeannie, née Jean Everald Nicol. The couple had given up sophisticated metropolitan lives, he as a newspaper columnist (during the war years he had worked for MI5) and she as a hotel PR executive, to live in isolation in a simple cottage surrounded by their beloved animals, which featured in nearly all his works. He had two older brothers Nigel Tangye who was also an author and Colin Tangye, a Lloyds Underwriter. The first of The Minack Chronicles was A Gull on the Roof published in 1961. This was followed by a new book almost every two years. The Way to Minack, the sixth book in the series details the path they took to be at Minack, while a Cottage on a Cliff  gives an account of the author's time with MI5.

Family life and old age
Derek was not originally fond of cats and was introduced to Monty, a ginger tom kitten, which was given to Jeannie at the Savoy. Derek told their housekeeper it should live in the kitchen, but Monty eventually ended up sleeping on their bed. Monty (named after General Montgomery) moved with Derek and Jeannie to Minack where he leapt across the small stream that crosses the path to the cottage. Derek dedicated one of his books (A Cat in the Window) to Monty. Later he wrote a book entitled Monty's Leap.

Jeannie, after whom one of his books was named, died in February 1986 and Derek lived on in the cottage for another ten years, dying at the age of 84 on 26 October 1996. He was in the process of writing Shadows just before his death. The thriller writer John le Carré, who lived a mile away along the cliffpath, gave the eulogy at his funeral.

Towards the end of their lives, the Tangyes bought the fields next to their cottage which are now preserved as a nature reserve. 'The Derek and Jeannie Tangye Minack Chronicles Nature Trust' was set up, in accordance with Derek's wishes, a year after his death and the Trustees manage the 18 acres. It was called Oliver land after the cat Oliver was seen hunting there before he joined them at Minack. It is a 'Place for Solitude' and quiet contemplation. It is ultimately a place for the wildlife, flora and fauna that reside there. The nature reserve was managed by a small group of trustees selected by Derek with the intention that at some point in the future they would hand over the reins to the charity organisation he had chosen Cornwall Wildlife Trust. In 2018 the CWT took over management and maintenance of Oliver land.

Tangye was reluctant to describe himself as a writer, but his simple literary style had appeal for a wide range of people who yearned to escape urban and suburban drudgery. His books described the couple's life growing potatoes and flowers (predominantly daffodils) on a cliff top smallholding in far west Cornwall. The donkeys and cats on their tiny farm all became "characters" in his books, and fans made a 'pilgrimage' from around the world, all eager to share – if only for a few hours – their rustic dream.  Invariably, Derek and Jeannie would uncork a bottle of wine and entertain visitors in their small, glazed cottage porch, where he was happy to regale them with tales of life at Minack and on occasion discuss matters of politics, environment and society in general!

Published books
Omnibus volumes and anthologies are not included below.
The majority of his books were published by Michael Joseph Ltd

1941: Time Was Mine. London: Hutchinson [He spent time in a cottage in Cornwall writing this book before he was called back to London to join the Army]
1942: Went the Day Well; edited by Derek Tangye with contributions from many writers. London: Harrap
--do.--(Reissued in 1995 by Michael Joseph, with subtitle: "tributes to men and women who died for freedom when Britain stood alone in the first two years of the Second World War".)
1944: One King: a survey of the dominions and colonies of the British empire. London: Harrap
1961: A Gull on the Roof. London: Michael Joseph
1962: A Cat in the Window. London: Michael Joseph (American ed. has title: Monty: biography of a marmalade cat.)
1963: A Drake at the Door. London: Michael Joseph
1965: A Donkey in the Meadow. London: Michael Joseph
1966: Lama. London: Michael Joseph
1968: The Way to Minack. London: Michael Joseph 
1970: A Cornish Summer London: Michael Joseph 
1972: Cottage on a Cliff. London: Michael Joseph
1974: A Cat Affair London: Michael Joseph 
1976; Somewhere a Cat is Waiting. Delacorte Press 1976
1976: Sun on the Lintel. London: Michael Joseph
1978: The Winding Lane. London: Michael Joseph 
1980: When the Winds Blow. London: Michael Joseph
1982: The Ambrose Rock. London: Michael Joseph
1984: A Quiet Year. London: Michael Joseph
1987: The Cherry Tree London: Michael Joseph
1988: Jeannie: a love story. London: Michael Joseph
1990: The Evening Gull. London: Michael Joseph
1993: Monty's Leap. London: Michael Joseph
1996: The Confusion Room. London: Michael Joseph

References

Further reading
 A profile of Derek Tangye appeared in the 1996 summer edition of Cornwall Arts by editor John Marquis, who interviewed him in March of that year, just a few months before his death.
 The Western Morning News published a report of Derek Tangye's funeral, with the eulogy given by his friend, neighbour and fellow writer, John le Carré.
 Web resources: Derek & Jeannie Tangye-The Minack Chronicles This website contains information, photos, special features pages and articles.

External links

Desert Island Discs; Derek Tangye
Derek Tangye: the Cornish Gardener; by John McCarthy
Derek & Jeannie Tangye - The Minack Chronicles

1912 births
1996 deaths
Novelists from Cornwall
20th-century English novelists